Basil Eugene Wells (June 11, 1912 – December 23, 2003) was an American writer.  His first published story, "Rebirth of Man" appeared in the magazine Super Science Stories in 1940.  He wrote science fiction, fantasy western and detective stories for various magazines sometimes under the name Gene Ellerman.  Two collections of his stories, Planets of Adventure and Doorways to Space were published by Fantasy Publishing Company, Inc.

References

External links
 
 
 

1912 births
2003 deaths
American crime fiction writers
American fantasy writers
American science fiction writers
Novelists from Pennsylvania
American male novelists
American male short story writers
20th-century American novelists
20th-century American short story writers
20th-century American male writers